Moly (Greek:) is a magical herb mentioned in book 10 of Homer's Odyssey.

In Greek myth 
In Homer's Odyssey, Hermes gave 
his herb to Odysseus to protect him from Circe's poison and magic when he went to her palace to rescue his friends. These friends came together with him from the island Aeolus after they escaped from the Laestrygonians. 

According to the "New History" of Ptolemy Hephaestion (according to Photius) and Eustathius, the plant mentioned by Homer grew from the blood of the Giant Picolous killed on Circe's island, by Helios, father and ally of Circe, when the Giant tried to attack Circe. In this description the flower had a black root, for the colour of the blood of the slain Giant, and a white flower, either for the white Sun that killed him, or the fact that Circe grew pale of terror. A derivation of the name was given, from the "hard" (Greek malos) combat with the Giant. 

Homer also describes Moly by saying "The root was black, while the flower was as white as milk; the gods call it Moly, Dangerous for a mortal man to pluck from the soil, but not for the deathless gods. All lies within their power".
So Ovid describes in book 14 of  his Metamorphoses: "A white bloom with a root of black".

Assignment to a real species 

There has been much controversy as to the identification. Kurt Sprengel believed that the plant is identical with Allium nigrum as Homer describes it. Some also believe that it may have been  Allium moly, instead, which is named after the mythical herb. Philippe Champault decides in favour of the Peganum harmala (of the family Nitrariaceae), the Syrian or African rue (Greek ), from the husks of which the vegetable alkaloid harmaline is extracted. The flowers are white with green stripes. These identifications are noticed by R. M. Henry, who illustrates the Homeric account by passages in the Paris and Leiden magical papyri, and argues that moly is probably a magical name, derived perhaps from Phoenician or Egyptian sources, for a plant which cannot be certainly identified. He shows that the "difficulty of pulling up" the plant is not a merely physical one, but rather connected with the peculiar powers claimed by magicians. 

Medical historians have speculated that the transformation to pigs was not intended literally but refers to anticholinergic intoxication. Symptoms include amnesia, hallucinations, and delusions – this description of "moly" fits the snowdrop, a flower of the region that contains galantamine, which is an anticholinesterase and can therefore counteract anticholinergics.

In other works 
In Tennyson's The Lotos-Eaters, the moly is coupled with the amaranth ("propt on beds of amaranth and moly").
Carl Linnaeus referenced the mythical plant with Allium moly, the scientific name for golden garlic, though the perianth of this species is yellow, not white.
 Thom Gunn made his poem Moly the title poem of his 1971 collection.
 In the Harry Potter universe, moly is a powerful plant that can be eaten to counteract enchantments.
 John Milton referred to "...that Moly/That Hermes once to wise Ulysses gave" in lines 636 and 637 of Comus.
 In Ursula K. Le Guin's A Wizard of Earthsea, Ged's aunt, a witch, is mentioned to have moly among the herbs in her hut. In The Farthest Shore, the true names of the moly plant are taught to students of Roke: "Now the petal of the flower of moly hath a name, which is iebera, and so also the sepal, which is partonath; and stem and leaf and root hath each his name..."
 In Alix E. Harrow's The Once and Future Witches, moly is used in a spell to turn a man into a swine: "Moly and spite a woman make, / May every man his true form take... A spell for swine, requiring wine & wicked intent"
 In the Kyōryū Sentai Zyuranger episode "Terror! Eaten In An Instant", the heroes face a monster called Dora Circe (Pudgy Pig in Mighty Morphin Power Rangers) which requires moly to defeat.

References

Sources 

Attribution
 

Greek mythology
Mythological plants
Circe
Helios in mythology
Odyssey
Deeds of Hermes
Odysseus